Robert Cunningham was one of the early Scots ministers who settled in Ulster in the 17th century. He was the first Presbyterian minister in Holywood and was one of Samuel Rutherford's correspondents. He was deposed for his adherence to Presbyterian principles.

Life
Robert Cunningham or Cunninghame was at first preacher for a while to the Earl of Buccleuch's regiment in Holland, but afterwards became minister at Holywood, in the North of Ireland. He was brought to Ulster by James Hamilton as were his fellow ministers John Livingstone and Robert Blair. Livingstone came after being urged by Cunningham. Cunningham was one of the first Scots ministers in County Down. He came to Ireland on the return of the troops to Scotland, and was, on the 9th of November 1615, admitted to the ministry by Robert Echlin, the Bishop of Down and Connor. He was returned on the diocesan roll, in 1622, as curate of Holywood and Craigavad, and as maintained in this office by a stipend from Sir James Hamilton who had been ennobled by the title of Lord Claneboy.

He was deposed from his ministry (with all the remaining Presbyterian ministers) in August 1636, following the death of Hugh Montgomery in the spring.

Family
He married Isabel Montgomerie, one of Sir Hugh Montgomery's daughters. He married Janet Kennedy. Robert Cunningham's sons by Janet were James, John and Robert. 

He had a daughter, Isabella (died 8 November 1703, aged 70), who married John Law, and had issue — William, professor of moral philosophy in the University of Edinburgh, founder of the family of Law of Elvingston, East Lothian.

Death and posthumous fines
His epitaph was written by Robert Blair:

Hic Cunninghami recubat Roberti 
Corpus. O qualis genius latebat, 
Quamque divinus fragili iuvolutus, 
Pulvere in isto !
Acrius nemo intonuit superbis ; 
Nemo dejectos magis erigebat ; 
Sed Dei laudes celebrando, vicit 
Seque aliosque.

Some weeks after Cunningham's death he was cited to appear in court and being deceased did not appear and was fined. His widow and eight children had there goods seized to pay the fine.

References
Citations

Sources

Covenanters
1637 deaths
Ulster Scots people
Evangelicals from Northern Ireland